The women's 1500 metres at the 2011 Asian Winter Games was held on January 31, 2011 in Astana, Kazakhstan.

Schedule
All times are Almaty Time (UTC+06:00)

Results
Legend
DNS — Did not start
PEN — Penalty

Heats

Heat 1

Heat 2

Heat 3

Finals

Final B

Final A

References

Final

External links
Official website

Women 1500